James A. Blacker (born 1945) is an English former professional footballer who played as a full back.

Career
Born in Leeds, Blacker played for Middleton Parkside and Bradford City. For Bradford City, he made 21 appearances in the Football League.

Sources

References

1945 births
Living people
English footballers
Bradford City A.F.C. players
English Football League players
Association football fullbacks